Big Stone City is a city in the northeastern corner of Grant County, South Dakota,  United States, that lies between the southern tip of Big Stone Lake and the northern bank of the Whetstone River, and is adjacent to the city of Ortonville, Minnesota. The population was 412 at the 2020 census.

History
The community now known as Big Stone City was established in 1878 as Inkpa City (after Chief Inkpaduta). It served as the seat of Grant County from 1880 to 1883. The present name comes from nearby Big Stone Lake. Big Stone City was incorporated in 1885.

Geography
Big Stone City is located at  (45.294824, -96.462898).

Big Stone City has been assigned the ZIP code 57216, and the FIPS place code 05540.

Demographics

2010 census
As of the census of 2010, there were 467 people, 236 households, and 134 families residing in the city. The racial makeup of the city was 97.9% White, 0.2% Native American, 0.4% Asian, 1.1% from other races, and 0.4% from two or more races. Hispanic or Latino of any race were 1.3% of the population.

There were 236 households, of which 17.4% had children under the age of 18 living with them, 47.5% were married couples living together, 5.9% had a female householder with no husband present, 3.4% had a male householder with no wife present, and 43.2% were non-families. 39.4% of all households were made up of individuals, and 16.9% had someone living alone who was 65 years of age or older. The average household size was 1.98 and the average family size was 2.60.

The median age in the city was 50.5 years. 16.9% of residents were under the age of 18; 4.4% were between the ages of 18 and 24; 17.6% were from 25 to 44; 39.7% were from 45 to 64; and 21.6% were 65 years of age or older. The gender makeup of the city was 50.5% male and 49.5% female.

2000 census
As of the census of 2000, there were 605 people, 254 households, and 166 families residing in the city. The population density was 491.5 people per square mile (189.9/km2). There were 309 housing units at an average density of 251.0 per square mile (97.0/km2). The racial makeup of the city was 99.17% White, 0.50% Native American, and 0.33% from two or more races.

There were 254 households, out of which 29.9% had children under the age of 18 living with them, 59.8% were married couples living together, 3.9% had a female householder with no husband present, and 34.3% were non-families. 31.1% of all households were made up of individuals, and 14.6% had someone living alone who was 65 years of age or older. The average household size was 2.33 and the average family size was 2.96.

In the city, the population was spread out, with 22.8% under the age of 18, 6.0% from 18 to 24, 25.5% from 25 to 44, 26.8% from 45 to 64, and 19.0% who were 65 years of age or older. The median age was 42 years. For every 100 females, there were 97.1 males. For every 100 females age 18 and over, there were 97.9 males.

The median income for a household in the city was $31,250, and the median income for a family was $39,583. Males had a median income of $22,875 versus $17,417 for females. The per capita income for the city was $19,297. About 7.4% of families and 11.2% of the population were below the poverty line, including 17.7% of those under age 18 and 16.5% of those age 65 or over.

Education
Big Stone City School District 25-1 is the local school district.

Notable person
 Sarah Hart (née Gengler), perpetrator of the Hart family murders

See also
 List of cities in South Dakota

References

External links

Cities in South Dakota
Cities in Grant County, South Dakota
1900 establishments in South Dakota